Terrible Day of the Big Gundown (also known as Vendetta at Dawn) is a 1971 Italian Spaghetti Western film directed by Sergio Garrone (here credited as Willy S. Regan).

Cast 

 George Eastman: Dr. George Benton 
 Ty Hardin: Jonathan Benton 
 Bruno Corazzari: Rod Fargas
 Laura Troschel: Lorry Baxter Benson 
 Steffen Zacharias: Gregory
 Guido Lollobrigida: Sheriff Jed
 Federico Boido: Peter Fargas 
 Dominic Barto: Carl Fargas
 Nello Pazzafini: Convict

References

External links

1971 films
Films scored by Francesco De Masi
Spaghetti Western films
1971 Western (genre) films
1970s Italian-language films
1970s Italian films